The 108th Brigade was a formation of  the British Army during the First World War. It was raised as part of the new army also known as Kitchener's Army and assigned to the 36th (Ulster) Division. The brigade served on the Western Front.

Formation 
The infantry battalions did not all serve at once, but all were assigned to the brigade during the war.
11th Battalion, Royal Irish Rifles (South Antrim)
12th Battalion, Royal Irish Rifles (Central Antrim)
13th Battalion, Royal Irish Rifles (County Down)
9th Battalion, Royal Irish Fusiliers (County Armagh)
108th Machine Gun Company
108th Trench Mortar Battery
7th Battalion, Royal Irish Rifles
2nd Battalion, Royal Irish Rifles
1st Battalion, Royal Irish Fusiliers

References 

Infantry brigades of the British Army in World War I
Pals Brigades of the British Army